Aamir Ali (born 5 May 2002) is a Pakistani cricketer. He made his first-class debut on 18 November 2019, for Sindh in the 2019–20 Quaid-e-Azam Trophy. In December 2019, he was drafted by the Pakistan Super League (PSL) franchise Peshawar Zalmi in Emerging category during the 2020 PSL draft. In December 2019, he was named in Pakistan's squad for the 2020 Under-19 Cricket World Cup.

References

External links
 

2002 births
Living people
Pakistani cricketers
Sindh cricketers
Peshawar Zalmi cricketers
People from Dadu District